Catherine "Kate" Klise (born April 13 in 1963) is an American writer known for children's fiction. Many of her books are illustrated by her sister, M. Sarah Klise. Their popular Regarding series is presented in a scrapbook format, with letters, journal entries, and related ephemera telling the story. She is also known for her picture books as well as the bestselling 43 Old Cemetery Road series. Klise's first adult novel, In the Bag, was released in 2012. She is a contributor to The Huffington Post.

Life and career
Klise was the fourth of six children born to educational film producer Thomas and Marjorie Klise. Raised in Peoria, Illinois, she attended Marquette University and spent fifteen years working as a correspondent for People magazine. She lives near Norwood, Missouri (from no later than 2007 apparently) –
on "a 40-acre farm in the Missouri Ozarks", she says in 2016. Her Huffington Post blog is subtitled "Writer and hiker".

Klise has identified E. B. White as one influence.

Books

Children's Books

Regarding series 

 Regarding the Fountain, 1998
 Regarding the Sink, 2004
 Regarding the Trees, 2005
 Regarding the Bathrooms, 2006
 Regarding the Bees, 2007

43 Old Cemetery Road series 

 Dying to Meet You, 2009
 Over My Dead Body, 2009
 Till Death Do Us Bark, 2011
 The Phantom of the Post Office, 2012
 Hollywood, Dead Ahead, 2013
 Greetings from the Graveyard, 2014
 The Loch Ness Punster, 2015

Three-Ring Rascals series 

 The Show Must Go On!, 2013
 The Greatest Star on Earth, 2014
 The Circus Goes to Sea, 2014
 Pop Goes the Circus!, 2015
 Secrets of the Circus, 2016

Standalone Books 

 Letters from Camp, 1999
 Trial by Journal, 2001
 Shall I Knit You a Hat?, 2004
 Why Do You Cry?, 2006
 Imagine Harry, 2007, with M. Sarah Klise
 Little Rabbit and the Night Mare, 2008, with M. Sarah Klise
 Little Rabbit and the Meanest Mother on Earth, 2010, with M. Sarah Klise
 Stand Straight, Ella Kate: The True Story of a Real Giant, 2010
 Grammy Lamby and the Secret Handshake, 2012
 Stay: A Girl, a Dog, a Bucket List, 2017
 Don't Check Out This Book!, 2020
 Mystery on Magnolia Circle, 2021

Novels 

 Deliver Us from Normal, 2005

 Far From Normal, 2006
 Grounded, 2010
 In the Bag, 2012
 Homesick, 2012

References

External links

 
 Kate and Sarah Klise
 Kate Klise and M. Sarah Klise at Encyclopedia.com 
 – from Something About the Author (Gale, 2006), both updated 2007 evidently
 
 
 M. Sarah Klise at LC Authorities, with 26 records, and at WorldCat

1963 births
Living people
American children's writers
Marquette University alumni
Writers from Peoria, Illinois